The 24th edition of the Vuelta Ciclista de Chile was held from April 19 to April 29, 2001.

Stages

2001-04-29: Santiago (Circuito "Las Condes") — Santiago (Circuito "Las Condes") (72 km)

Final classification

References 
 cyclingnews

Vuelta Ciclista de Chile
Chile
Vuelta Ciclista
April 2001 sports events in South America